"On My Knees" is the debut single of British R&B girl group the 411, released on 17 May 2004 and included on their first album, Between the Sheets (2004). The song samples "Ain't My Style" by the Main Ingredient and features guest vocals from American rapper Ghostface Killah. On the UK Singles Chart, the song reached number four and spent 10 weeks in the UK top 75. It also charted in nine other countries in Europe and Australia.

Background
Band member Suzie Furlonger said: "It's basically about a girl who's in a relationship with someone that she knew was wrong for her at the time but allowed it anyway. He doesn't treat her well. It's her turning round to him and saying "that's it! I don't have to put up with this anymore". It's not a man-hating song - just a "don't put up with being treated badly" song." Bandmate Tisha Martin added, "Yeah, don't get us wrong - a lot of people think that we're men bashing but were not - we do like the guys!"

Track listings

Charts

Weekly charts

Year-end charts

Release history

References

2004 debut singles
2004 songs
The 411 songs
Songs written by Ed Townsend
Sony Music UK singles